Federal University of Technology may refer to

Federal University of Technology Akure Nigeria
Federal University of Technology Owerri Nigeria
Federal University of Technology Minna Nigeria
Federal University of Technology Yola Nigeria